The , also known as the , was a domain (han) of the Tokugawa Shogunate of Japan during the Edo period from 1600 to 1871. 

The Chōshū Domain was based at Hagi Castle in Nagato Province, in the modern city of Hagi, located in the Chūgoku region of the island of Honshu. The Chōshū Domain was ruled for its existence by the tozama daimyō of the Mōri, whose branches also ruled the neighboring Chōfu and Kiyosue domains, and was assessed under the Kokudaka system with peak value of 369,000 koku. The Chōshū Domain was the most prominent anti-Tokugawa domain and formed the Satchō Alliance with the rival Satsuma Domain during the Meiji Restoration, becoming instrumental in the establishment of the Empire of Japan and the Meiji oligarchy. The Chōshū Domain was dissolved in the abolition of the han system in 1871 by the Meiji government and its territory was absorbed into Yamaguchi Prefecture.

History 
The rulers of Chōshū were the descendants of the great Sengoku warlord Mōri Motonari. Motonari was able to extend his power over all of the Chūgoku region of Japan and occupied a territory worth 1,200,000 koku. After he died, his grandson and heir Mōri Terumoto became daimyō and implemented a strategy of alliance with Toyotomi Hideyoshi. This would later prove to be a great mistake. After Hideyoshi's death, the daimyō Tokugawa Ieyasu challenged the Toyotomi power and battled with Hideyoshi's trusted advisor Ishida Mitsunari at the Battle of Sekigahara. Mōri Terumoto was the most powerful ally of the Toyotomi and was elected by a council of Toyotomi loyalists to be the titulary head of the Toyotomi force. However the Toyotomi forces lost the battle due to several factors tied to Mōri Terumoto:
 His cousin Kikkawa Hiroie secretly made a deal with Tokugawa Ieyasu resulting in the inactivity of 15,000 Mōri soldiers during the battle.
 His adopted cousin Kobayakawa Hideaki and his 15,600 soldiers betrayed Ishida and joined the Tokugawa side.
 After assurances from Tokugawa Ieyasu, Terumoto gave up the formidable Osaka castle without a fight.

Despite its inactivity, the Mōri clan was removed from its ancestral home in Aki to Nagato Province (also known as Chōshū), and its holdings were drastically reduced from 1,200,000 to 369,000 koku.

This was seen as a great act of betrayal to the Mōri clan, and Chōshū later became a hotbed of anti-Tokugawa activities. The origins of this were evident in the tradition of the clan's New Year's meeting. Every year during the meeting, the elders and the administrators would ask the daimyo whether the time to overthrow the shogunate had come, to which the daimyo would reply: "Not yet, the shogunate is still too powerful."

This dream would eventually be realized some 260 years later, when the domain joined forces with the Satsuma Domain and sympathetic court nobles to overthrow the Tokugawa shogunate. 
In 1865, the domain bought a war-ship Union (ja) from Glover and Co., an agency of Jardine Matheson established in Nagasaki, in the name of Satsuma Domain.  
They led the fight against the armies of the former shōgun, which included the Ōuetsu Reppan Dōmei, Aizu, and the Ezo Republic, during the Boshin War. The domains' military forces of 1867 through 1869 also formed the foundation for the Imperial Japanese Army. Thanks to this alliance, Chōshū and Satsuma natives enjoyed political and societal prominence well into the Meiji and even Taishō eras.

Economics 

The initial reduction of 1.2 million to 369,000 koku resulted in a large shortfall in terms of military upkeep and infrastructure maintenance, despite which the domain remained the seventh-largest in Japan outside the shogunate-controlled domains. In order to bring the domain's finances out of debt, strict policies were enforced on the retainers:
 All retainers' fiefs were drastically reduced.
 Some retainers who were paid in land began to be paid in rice.
 Some retainers were laid off and encouraged to engage in agriculture.

Previously, as a result of high taxation, farmers secretly developed farms far inside the mountains as a private food source. A new land survey was conducted within the domain in which many hidden farms were discovered and taxed. The domain also began a strict policy with regard to trade.

Laws were also passed through which the profitable trade of the "four whites" was controlled by the domain: paper, rice, salt, and wax. Some of the profits, and a large amount of the tax revenue from this trade, went into the domain coffers.

These policies greatly strengthened the domain's finances and allowed the daimyo more effective control over his territory. However, these policies angered peasants and displaced samurai alike, resulting in frequent revolts.

Politics 

The capital of the domain was the castle town of Hagi, which was the source of Chōshū's alternate name of Hagi han (萩藩).

The domain remained under the rule of the Mōri family for the duration of the Edo period. Because the shogunate frequently confiscated domains whose daimyo were unable to produce heirs, the Mōri daimyo created four subordinate han ruled by branches of the family:
 Iwakuni han: 60,000 koku, ruled by descendants of Kikkawa Hiroie.
 Chōfū han: 50,000 koku, ruled by descendants of Mōri Hidemoto.
 Tokuyama han: 40,000 koku, ruled by descendants of Mōri Naritaka.
 Kiyosue han: 10,000 koku, ruled by descendants of Mōri Mototomo.

During the Edo period, the main branch died out in 1707, after which heirs were adopted from the Chōfu branch, which also became extinct in 1751. The family then continued through the Kiyosue branch.

The Mōri daimyo, as with many of his counterparts throughout Japan, was assisted in the government of his domain by a group of karō, or domain elders. There were two kinds of karō in Chōshū: hereditary karō (whose families retained the rank in perpetuity) and the "lifetime karō", whose rank was granted to an individual but could not be inherited by his son.

The hereditary karō were either members of minor branches of the Mōri family, or members of related families such as the Shishido and the Fukuhara, or descendants of Mōri Motonari's most trusted generals and advisors such as the Mazuda, the Kuchiba and the Kunishi.

The lifetime karō were middle or lower samurai who displayed great talent in economics or politics and were promoted to karō by the daimyō. One such person was the great reformer Murata Seifu.

List of daimyōs 
  Mōri clan (Tozama, 369,000 koku), 1600–1871

Simplified family tree of the main Mōri line (Lords of Chōshū) 

Mōri Motonari (1497–1571)
Takamoto (1523–1563)
 I. Terumoto, 1st Lord of Chōshū (cr. 1600) (1553–1625; r. 1600–1623)
 II. Hidenari, 2nd Lord of Chōshū (1595–1651; r. 1623–1651)
 III. Tsunahiro, 3rd Lord of Chōshū (1639–1689; r. 1651–1682)
 IV. Yoshinari, 4th Lord of Chōshū (1668–1694; r. 1682–1694).
  V. Yoshihiro, 5th Lord of Chōshū (1673–1707; r. 1694–1707)
Naritaka, 1st Lord of Tokuyama (1602–1679)
Mototsugu, 3rd Lord of Tokuyama (1667–1719)
Hirotoyo, 5th Lord of Tokuyama (1705–1773)
Nariyoshi, 7th Lord of Tokuyama (1750–1828)
Hiroshige, 8th Lord of Tokuyama (1777–1866)
  XV. Motonori, 15th Lord of Chōshū, 1st Prince (1839–1896; r. 1869, Governor of Hagi 1869–1871, family head 1871–1896, created 1st Prince 1884)
Motoaki, 29th family head, 2nd Prince (1865–1938; 29th family head and 2nd Prince 1896–1938)
Motomichi, 30th family head, 3rd Prince (1903–1976; 30th family head 1938–1976, 3rd Prince to 1947)
Motoyoshi, 31st family head (1930– ; 31st family head 1976–)
 Motoei (born 1967)
Motokiyo (1551–1597)
Hidemoto, 1st Lord of Chōfū (1579–1650)
Mitsuhiro, 2nd Lord of Chōfū (1616–1653)
Tsunamoto, 3rd Lord of Chōfū (1650–1709)
 VI. Yoshimoto, 6th Lord of Chōshū (1677–1731; r. 1707–1731)
  VII. Munehiro, 7th Lord of Chōshū (1715–1751; r. 1731–1751)
Mototomo, 1st Lord of Kiyosue (1631–1683)
Masahiro, 6th Lord of Chōfū, 2nd Lord of Kiyosue (1675–1729)
 VIII. Shigetaka, 8th Lord of Chōshū (1725–1789; r. 1751–1782)
 IX. Haruchika, 9th Lord of Chōshū (1754–1791; r. 1782–1791)
 X. Narifusa, 10th Lord of Chōshū (1779–1809; r. 1791–1809)
 XI. Narihiro, 11th Lord of Chōshū (1784–1836; r. 1809–1824)
   XIII. Naritō, 13th Lord of Chōshū (1815–1836; r. 1836).
Chikaaki (1766–1800)
 XII. Narimoto, 12th Lord of Chōshū (1794–1836; r. 1824–1836) 
  XIV. Takachika, 14th Lord of Chōshū (1819–1871; r. 1836–1869)

Famous people 
 Middle Edo period
 Murata Seifū (1783–1855), conducted the Tempō reforms in Chōshū

 Bakumatsu period
 Yoshida Shōin (1830–1859), educator and teacher of many reformers
 Takasugi Shinsaku (1839–1867), significant contributor to Meiji Restoration, founder of the Kiheitai
 Kijima Matabei (1817–1864), swordsman, took part in the Kinmon Incident
 Kunishi Shinano (1842–1864), committed seppuku to take responsibility for the Kinmon Incident
 Kido Takayoshi (Kido Kōin) (1833–1877), Bakumatsu reformer, one of Three Great Nobles of the Restoration

 Meiji statesmen
 Chōshū Five
 Itō Shunsuke, later Itō Hirobumi (1841–1909), first Prime Minister of Japan
 Inoue Monta, later Inoue Kaoru (1836–1915), Meiji statesman
 Yamao Yōzō (1837–1917), later studied engineering at the Andersonian Institute, Glasgow, 1866–68, Meiji statesman
 Endō Kinsuke (1836–1893), Meiji statesman
 Nomura Yakichi, later Inoue Masaru (1843–1910), "father of the Japanese railways"
 Yamagata Aritomo (1838–1922), prime minister and field marshal of the Imperial Japanese Army
 Yamagata Isaburō (1858–1927), nephew of Yamagata Aritomo, Minister of Communications, and first Japanese Inspector-General of Korea.
 Katsura Tarō (1848–1913), general in the Imperial Japanese Army and three-time prime minister of Japan
 Terauchi Masatake (1852–1919), Field Marshal in the Imperial Japanese Army and 18th prime minister of Japan
 Tanaka Giichi (1864–1929), general in the Imperial Japanese Army and 26th prime minister of Japan
 Aoki Shūzō (1844–1914), diplomat and Foreign Minister in Meiji Japan
 Shinagawa Yajirō (1843–1900), Home Minister in early Meiji Japan
 Sone Arasuke (1849–1910), politician, diplomat, cabinet minister, and second Japanese Resident-General of Korea.

 Imperial Japanese Army personnel
 Ōmura Masujirō (1824–1869), "Father of the modern Japanese Army"
 Ōshima Yoshimasa (1850–1926), general in the Imperial Japanese Army during the First Sino-Japanese War
 Nogi Maresuke (1849–1912), general in the Imperial Japanese Army, and a prominent figure in the Russo-Japanese War
 Miura Gorō (1847–1926), lieutenant general in the Imperial Japanese Army
 Sakuma Samata (1844–1915), general in the Imperial Japanese Army, and 5th Governor-General of Taiwan (1906–1915)
 Kodama Gentarō (1852–1906), general in the Imperial Japanese Army and government minister in Meiji Japan
 Oka Ichinosuke (1860–1916), general in the Imperial Japanese Army and Minister of War during World War I
 Arisaka Nariakira (1852–1915), lieutenant general in the Imperial Japanese Army, inventor of the Arisaka Rifle

 Imperial Japanese Navy personnel
 Tsuboi Kōzō (1843–1898), admiral of the Imperial Japanese Navy
 Nashiba Tokioki (1850–1924), admiral in the Imperial Japanese Navy
 Arichi Shinanojō (1843–1919), admiral in the Imperial Japanese Navy, Chief of the Imperial Japanese Navy General Staff

 Writers
 Inoue Koichi (pen-name: Inoue Kenkabō) (1870–1934), journalist and writer of senryū (short, humorous verse)

 Historians
 Inoue Mitsusada (1917–1983), Historian of Ancient Japan, Professor of The University of Tokyo, first director of National Museum of Japanese History, Grandson of Inoue Kaoru and Katsura Taro

 Entrepreneurs
 Aikawa Yoshisuke (1880–1967) Japanese entrepreneur, businessman, and politician, founder and first president of the Nissan zaibatsu (1931–1945)

See also 
 First Chōshū expedition
 Satchō Alliance
 Second Chōshū expedition
 Boshin War
 List of Han

Notes

References

Further reading
 Bakufu seichō kiroku 幕府征長記錄 (1973). Edited by Nihon Shiseki Kyōkai 日本史籍協會. Tokyo: Tokyo Daigaku Shuppankai.
 Craig, Albert M. (1961). Chōshū in the Meiji restoration. Cambridge: Harvard University Press.
 Huber, Thomas M. (1981). The Revolutionary Origins of Modern Japan. Stanford, California: Stanford University Press.
 Ogawa Ayako 小川亜弥子 (1998). Bakumatsuki Chōshū-han yōgakushi no kenkyū 幕末期長州藩洋学史の研究. Tokyo: Shibunkaku Shuppan.

Mōri clan
Choshu Han
Choshu Han
Chūgoku region